In Greek mythology, Melicertes (sometimes Melecertes), later called Palaemon or Palaimon, was a Boeotian prince as the son of King Athamas and Ino, daughter of King Cadmus of Thebes. He was the brother of Learchus.

Mythology

Ino, pursued by her husband, who had been driven mad by Hera because Ino had brought up the infant Dionysus, threw herself and Melicertes into the sea from a high rock between Megara and Corinth, Both were changed into marine deities: Ino as Leucothea, noted by Homer, Melicertes as Palaemon. The body of the latter was carried by a dolphin to the Isthmus of Corinth and deposited under a pine tree. Here it was found by his uncle Sisyphus, who had it removed to Corinth, and by command of the Nereids instituted the Isthmian Games and sacrifices in his honor.

In literature and art
Palaemon appears for the first time in Euripides' Iphigeneia in Tauris, where he is already the "guardian of ships". The paramount identification in the Latin poets of the Augustan age is with Portunus, the Roman god of safe harbours, memorably in Virgil's Georgics. Ovid twice told the story of Ino's sea-plunge with Melicertes in her arms.

Ovid's treatment in his Fasti is the earliest to identify the Isthmus as the location, though without literally naming it:

In later Latin poets there are numerous identifications of Palaemon with the sanctuary at the Isthmus, where no archaeological evidence was found for a pre-Augustan cult.

Hyginus states both that Ino cast herself into the sea with her younger son by Athamas, Melicertes, and was made a goddess, and that Ino, daughter of Cadmus, killed her son Melicertes by Athamas, son of Aeolus, when she was fleeing from Athamas.

In Greco-Roman views, Palaemon is viewed as a dolphin riding boy, or a child with a triton tail.

Origins
No satisfactory origin of the name Palaemon has been given. The name means the "wrestler", and is an epithet of Heracles, with whom Melqart is identified by interpretatio graeca and referred to as the "Tyrian Herakles", but there does not appear to be any traditional connection between Heracles and Palaemon. Melicertes being Phoenician, Palaemon also has been explained as the "burning lord" (Baal-haman), but there seems little in common between a god of the sea and a god of fire. The Romans identified Palaemon with Portunus (the harbour god), and some took the name Palaemon to mean "the honey eater".

Cult

In the late 2nd century CE, within the sanctuary of Poseidon at Isthmia, Pausanias saw a temple of Palaemon:

In company with Leucothea, Melicertes/Palaemon was widely invoked for protection from dangers at sea.

There seems considerable doubt whether or not the cult of Melicertes was of foreign, probably Phoenician, origin, and introduced by Phoenician navigators on the coasts and islands of the Aegean and Mediterranean. For the Hellenes he is a native of Boeotia, where Phoenician influences were strong; at Tenedos he was propitiated by the sacrifice of children which seems to point to his identity with Melqart. The premature death of the child in the Greek form of the legend is probably an allusion to this.

In 1956, excavations at Isthmia under the direction of Broneer uncovered the small sanctuary of Palaemon, which eventually had a tiny Roman round temple in the Corinthian order, which appeared on coins of Corinth in the 2nd century CE; it was the successor to two previous more modest architectural phases of the sanctuary. The foundations of the temple were found to lie over the starting-line of a late-5th- or early-4th century BCE stadium. Worship was characterized by the dedication of hundreds of wheelmade oil lamps of a distinct type. A cult of Melicertes of great antiquity, possibly based on pre-Hellenic figures of Ino and Melicertes, was posited by Will, just previous to the site's discovery and refuted by Hawthorne in 1958.

Notes

Citations

References
 Euripides, The Complete Greek Drama, edited by Whitney J. Oates and Eugene O'Neill, Jr. in two volumes. 1. Iphigenia in Tauris, translated by Robert Potter. New York. Random House. 1938. Online version at the Perseus Digital Library.
 Euripides, Euripidis Fabulae. vol. 2. Gilbert Murray. Oxford. Clarendon Press, Oxford. 1913. Greek text available at the Perseus Digital Library.
 Fontenrose, Joseph Eddy, Python: A Study of Delphic Myth and Its Origins, University of California Press, 1959. .
 Fowler, R. L. (2013), Early Greek Mythography: Volume 2: Commentary, Oxford University Press, 2013. .
 Gaius Julius Hyginus, Fabulae from The Myths of Hyginus translated and edited by Mary Grant. University of Kansas Publications in Humanistic Studies. Online version at the Topos Text Project.
 Homer, The Odyssey with an English Translation by A.T. Murray, PH.D. in two volumes. Cambridge, MA., Harvard University Press; London, William Heinemann, Ltd. 1919. . Online version at the Perseus Digital Library. Greek text available from the same website.
 Publius Ovidius Naso, Fasti translated by James G. Frazer. Online version at the Topos Text Project.
 Publius Ovidius Naso, Fasti. Sir James George Frazer. London; Cambridge, MA. William Heinemann Ltd.; Harvard University Press. 1933. Latin text available at the Perseus Digital Library.
 Publius Ovidius Naso, Metamorphoses translated by Brookes More (1859-1942). Boston, Cornhill Publishing Co. 1922. Online version at the Perseus Digital Library.
 Publius Ovidius Naso, Metamorphoses. Hugo Magnus. Gotha (Germany). Friedr. Andr. Perthes. 1892. Latin text available at the Perseus Digital Library.
 Publius Vergilius Maro, Bucolics, Aeneid, and Georgics of Vergil. J. B. Greenough. Boston. Ginn & Co. 1900. Online version at the Perseus Digital Library.

Sea and river gods
Greek gods
Family of Athamas
Princes in Greek mythology
Boeotian characters in Greek mythology
Phoenician characters in Greek mythology
Boeotian mythology
Corinthian mythology